Romaniuk or Romanyuk is a surname. It may refer to:

Greg Romaniuk (born 1971), Canadian-American curler
Kyrylo Romanyuk (born 2001), Ukrainian footballer
Patriarch Volodomyr (Romaniuk) (1925–1995), Patriarch of the Ukrainian Orthodox Church – Kiev Patriarchate
Roman Romanyuk (born 1961), Ukrainian politician
Russ Romaniuk (born 1970), Canadian ice hockey player
Vitaliy Romanyuk (born 1984), Ukrainian footballer
Wojciech Romaniuk (born 1970), Polish politician
Yuriy Romanyuk (born 1997), Ukrainian footballer

See also
 
 

Ukrainian-language surnames
Surnames of Ukrainian origin